The Farebrother-Sullivan Trophy is a Fijian rugby union competition open to the regional representative teams of the districts of Fiji.

History
The trophy was offered to the Fiji Rugby Union by JJ Sullivan and AS Farebrother, the latter being the manager of the first Fijian team to play abroad in 1924.

Between 1941 and 1953, this competition was disputed in the form of cup between the regional district teams. Five of them would participate to the first edition in 1941. Since 1954, the competition develops around a match: the holder of the trophy accept the challenges from the other teams and the trophy is attributed to the winning team.
This format is also used in New Zealand, in the Ranfurly Shield. The challenges generally are played at the end of summer and in autumn. In case of draw, the defending champion keeps the trophy. Practically, only the three teams from the first division of the regional competition, the Colonial Cup, compete, but for three times, a team from the inferior division, the B-Division, challenged the defending champion.
Suva, won the trophy between 1941 and 1947, undefeated in 1951. Nadroga dominated the competition in the 1970s, establishing the record of 28 consecutive wins, before Nadi came to join the competition in the 1980s. In the late 1990s, Lautoka and then, Naitasiri, founded in 1998, became the fourth and fifth great names of the competition.

Results
The defending champion is listed first. The victorious challengers are signed with a °

2008
Tailevu 17-14 Nadroga

2007
Tailevu 25-13  Tavua
Tailevu 13-8  Nadi
Tailevu-Lautoka  17-10
Tailevu 25-22 Suva
Tailevu 10-6 Naitasiri
Tailevu 21-12  Ovalau
Nadroga 31-27 Tailevu
Nadroga 74-3 Vatukoula 
Nadroga 69-10 Namosi
Nadroga 30-24  Northland
Nadroga 41-8 Navosa

2006
11/11 Nadroga 27-24 Ovalau
04/11 Naitasiri 10-18 Nadroga°
28/10 Naitasiri 20-8 Suva
21/10 Naitasiri 28-25 Nadi
14/10 Naitasiri 22-6 Lautoka
07/10 Naitasiri 18-11 Navosa 
09/09 Naitasiri 29-11 Tailevu 

2005
 Suva 8-13 Naitasiri°
 Suva 19-18 Nadi
Nadroga 21-29 Suva°
  Nadroga 25-18 Lautoka
 Nadroga 95-8 Tavua

2004
27/11 Nadroga 13-5 Naitasiri
20/11 Nadroga 15-9 Suva
30/10 Nadroga 15-9 Lautoka
23/10 Nadi 13 Nadroga 49
09/10 Tailevu 18-34 Nadi°
21/08 Tailevu 33-12 Vatukoula
24/07 Tailevu 23-12 Namosi
26/06 Tailevu 25-20 Navosa

2003
11/10 Lautoka 14-19 Tailevu°
04/10 Lautoka 19--15 Nadroga 
27/09 Lautoka 16-14 Suva
02/08 Lautoka 25-5 Nadi
26/07 Naitasiri 13-18 Lautoka°
19/07 Naitasiri 18-17 Navosa
12/07 Naitasiri 27-21 Namosi
28/06 Naitasiri 15-6 Ovalau 

2002
14/09 Naitasiri 23-9 Suva
28/09 Naitasiri 12-6 Nadroga
14/09 Nadi 13-28 Naitasiri°
31/08 Nadi 11-9 Tailevu 
24/08 Namosi 10-27 Nadi° 
17/08 Ovalau 9-14 Namosi°
03/08 Ovalau 12-9 Rewa
15/06 Lautoka 13-17 Ovalau°

2001
24/11 Lautoka 15-0 Nadroga
17/11 Lautoka 17-6 Suva
10/11 Lautoka 10-10 Naitasiri
03/11 Nadi 12-15 Lautoka °
27/10 Nadi 17-16 Tailevu 
20/10 Nadi 33-13 Ovalau 

2000
11/11 Nadi 9-3 Suva
04/11 Nadi 11-11 Nadroga
28/10 Naitasiri 8-9 Nadi°
21/10 Naitasiri 31-10 Ovalau
30/09 Naitasiri 9-3 Lautoka
16/09 Naitasiri 15-13 Tailevu
05/08 Naitasiri 30-12 Namosi

1999
16/10 Naitasiri 18–10 Nadroga
25/09 Naitasiri 37–3 Vatukoula
11/09 Naitasiri 25–20 Lautoka
28/08 Nadi 5–10 Naitasiri°
14/08 Nadi 27–15 Suva
31/07 Nadi 15–10 Tailevu
17/07 Nadi 35–0 Ra
12/06 Nadi 17–13 Namosi

1998
24/10 Suva 31–34 Nadi°
10/10 Naitasiri 14–24 Suva°
12/09 Naitasiri 40–8 Ra (B Division)
22/08 Naitasiri 12–8 Tailevu
08/08 Naitasiri 51–13 Macuata
11/07 Nadroga 18–25 Naitasiri°
20/06 Nadroga 39–6 Lautoka

1997
18/10 Nadroga 37–15 Suva
11/10 Nadroga 34–19 Namosi
27/09 Nadroga 23–14 Nadi
06/09 Nadroga 23–15 Lautoka
23/08 Nadroga 23–14 Naitasiri North
09/08 Nadroga 22–13 Tavua
19/07 Nadroga 15–11 Tailevu

1996
26/10 Nadroga 27–10 Suva
05/10 Nadroga 48–10 Lautoka
21/09 Nadroga 57–24 Vatukoula
14/09 Nadroga 45–8 Macuata
07/09 Nadroga 19–10 Nadi
17/08 Nadroga 63–0 Rewa
13/07 Nadroga 29–6 Burebesaga

1995
07/10 Nadi 11-18 Nadroga°
30/09 Nadi 11–6 Suva
16/09 Nadi 22-3 Tavua (B Division)
09/09 Nadi 32–19 Rewa
26/08 Nadi 27–16 Lautoka
19/08 Nadi 31–5 Vatukoula
22/07 Nadi 10–6 Naitasiri North

1994
15/10 Nadi 18–8 Nadroga
08/10 Nadi 22–12 Suva
01/10 Nadi 32–16 Lautoka
24/09 Nadi 21–16 Rewa
10/09 Nadi 36–3 Burebasaga
03/09 Nadi 28–8 Vatukoula
06/09 Nadi 31–13 Naitasiri North
11/06 Nadi 38–18 Ba

1993
16/10 Nadi 14–5 Rewa
02/10 Suva 17–29 Nadi°
09/10 Suva 21–21 Nadroga
11/09 Suva 5–5 Vatukoula
14/08 Suva 20–3 Ba
07/08 Suva 28–16 Lautoka
24/07 Suva 38–11 Namosi
03/07 Suva 15–7 Naitasiri North

1992
10/10 Suva 46–3 Lautoka
03/10 Nadroga 8–25 Suva°
26/09 Nadroga – Rewa
12/09 Nadroga 67–3 Tailevu
22/08 Nadi 9–10 Nadroga°
08/08 Nadi 20–6 Naitasiri North
18/07 Nadi 18–9 Serua Namosi
27/06 Nadi 41–3 Ba

1991
07/09 Nadi 23–7 Tavua
03/08 Nadi 17–0 Naitasiri North
13/07 Nadi 6–3 Rewa
29/06 Suva 15–20 Nadi°
22/06 Suva 23–13 Nadroga
15/06 Suva 15–6 Lautoka
25/05 Suva 19–7 Namosi
27/04 Suva 35–3 Ba

1990
13/10 Suva 17–6 Rewa
29/09 Suva 33–6 Cakaudrove
15/09 Suva 23–10 Nadi
01/09 Suva 14–3 Naitasiri North
25/08 Suva 13–7 Nadroga
18/08 Suva 10–10 Lautoka
04/08 Suva 39–6 Ba
28/07 Suva 29–6 Namosi

1989
09/09 Suva 20–9 Rewa
02/09 Suva 67–4 Ra (B Division)
26/08 Suva 24–10 Nadi
19/08 Suva 36–3 Naitasiri North
05/08 Suva 37–4 Nadroga
24/06 Suva 71–3 Lautoka
03/06 Suva 18–6 Serua Namosi

1988
01/10 Suva 21–6 Nadroga
24/09 Suva 34–6 Ba/Tavua
10/09 Nadi 4–15 Suva°
27/08 Nadi 20–6 Rewa
13/08 Nadi 22–6 Lautoka
16/06 Nadi 9–7 Naitasiri North

1987
17/10 Nadi 23–13 Vatukoula
03/10 Nadi 19–13 Suva
26/00 Nadi 19–9 Nadroga
05/09 Nadi 28–9 Rewa
01/08 Nadi 24–12 Lautoka

1986
04/10 Nadi 7–3 Nadroga
13/09 Nadi 15–0 Burebasaga
23/08 Nadi 15–7 Suva
26/07 Nadi 10–8 Lautoka
07/06 Nadi 7–7 Rewa

1985
07/09 Nadi 14–13 Suva
28/08 Nadi 16–8 Nadroga
03/08 Nadi 12–0 Lautoka
22/06 Nadi 10–9 Rewa

1984
01/09 Nadi 15–10 Nadroga
11/08 Nadi 15–0 Suva

1983
01/10 Nadroga 9–12 Nadi°
06/08 Nadroga 13–12 Suva
23/07 Nadroga 23–4 Rewa
02/07 Nadroga 13–3 Lautoka

1982
04/09 Nadroga 15–8 Nadi
07/08 Nadroga 6–6 Suva
24/07 Nadroga 13–12 Rewa
19/06 Nadroga 17–6 Naitasiri North

1981
10/10 Nadi 4–7 Nadroga°
06/06 Nadi 20–6 Lautoka

1980
04/10 Nadi 22–7 Nadroga
20/09 Nadi 24–0 Suva
28/06 Nadi 17–12 Lautoka

1979
06/10 Lautoka 12–15 Nadi°
29/09 Nadroga 4–6 Lautoka°
22/09 Nadroga 22–3 Suva
11/08 Nadroga 28–10 Rewa

1978
07/10 Nadroga 18–9 Suva
23/09 Nadroga 12–6 Lautoka
02/09 Nadroga 14–4 Rewa
26/08 Nadroga 16–0 Nadi

1977
15/10 Nadroga 10–6 Nadi
01/10 Nadroga 14–6 Suva
24/09 Nadroga 25–25 Rewa
27/08 Nadroga 24–12 Lautoka

1976
09/10 Nadroga 18–9 Suva
02/10 Nadroga 9–3 Rewa
18/09 Nadroga 9–7 Nadi

1975
27/09 Nadroga 9–4 Rewa
15/09 Nadroga 15–0 Nadi
09/08 Nadroga 8–0 Suva
05/07 Nadroga 11–6 Lautoka

1974
28/09 Nadroga 6–3 Nadi
29/06 Nadroga 14–0 Suva
25/05 Nadroga 22–3 Rewa

1973
28/07 Nadroga 40–7 Suva
29/07 Nadroga 24–3 Labasa

1972
Nadroga

1971
25/09 Nadroga 38–3 Rewa
21/08 Nadi 3–12 Nadroga°
24/07 Nadi 23–11 Suva
12/06 Nadi 34–14 Lautoka

1970
Nadi

1969
Nadi

1968
Nadi bat Suva

1967
16/09 Suva 36–3 Tavua
02/09 Suva 20–3 Vatukoula

1966
Suva 16–11 Rewa
Suva 50–0 Wainibuka
Suva 16–6 Nadi
Lautoka 6–19 Suva°

1965
Lautoka 6–19 Suva
Lautoka 14–3 Rewa
Lautoka 14–14 Vatukoula
Nadroga 0–5 Lautoka°

1964
01/08 Nadroga 18–5 Suva
18/07 Lautoka 3–14 Nadroga°
06/06 Nadi 3–6 Lautoka°

1963
Nadi beats Suva

1962
Suva

1961
Suva

1960
Suva

1959
Suva beats Nadi

1958
Nadi 23–3 Suva
Nadi beats Nadroga 

1957
Nadroga beats Suva 

1956
Suva

1955
Suva

1954
Suva

1953
Suva

1952
Suva bat Northern Districts 

1951
Northern Districts bat Suva 

1950
Suva

1949
Suva

1948
Suva

1947
Suva

1946
Suva

1945
Suva

1944
Suva

1943
Suva

1942
Suva

1941
Suva

Statistics
As of 23 September 2008

Title winners
8 Nadi

74 Suva

68 Nadroga

18 Naitasiri

14 Lautoka

11 Tailevu

2 Ovalau

1 Northern Districts

1 Namosi

References

External links
The Farebrother-Sullivan Trophy at the Fiji Rugby website

Rugby union competitions in Fiji